Lerke Osterloh (born 29 September 1944 in Wüsting-Holle near Oldenburg) is a German judge, jurisprudent and tax law expert. She was sitting Justice of the Federal Constitutional Court of Germany in the court's second senate from October 1998 until her retirement in November 2010. Her successor is Monika Hermanns. Along with Gertrude Lübbe-Wolff and Michael Gerhardt, she was considered a member of the senate's left-liberal wing.

See also
Federal Constitutional Court of Germany

References

External links
 Bundesverfassungsgericht -- Justice Osterloh's website

1944 births
Living people
German women judges
Scholars of tax law
German legal scholars
People from Oldenburg (city)
Justices of the Federal Constitutional Court
Grand Crosses with Star and Sash of the Order of Merit of the Federal Republic of Germany
20th-century German judges
21st-century German judges
Women legal scholars
20th-century women judges
21st-century women judges
20th-century German women
21st-century German women